James Alexander Ferguson (February 16, 1897 – April 26, 1976) was a pitcher in Major League Baseball who played for five different teams between 1918 and 1929.

Born in Montclair, New Jersey, Ferguson was raised in nearby Bloomfield. He died in Sepulveda, California, at age 79.

Professional career
Ferguson was one of the first forkball specialists in major league history. He entered the majors in 1918 with the New York Yankees, playing for them two years (1918, 1921) before joining the Boston Red Sox (1922–1925), Washington Senators (1925–1926), again the Yankees (1925), and with the Philadelphia Phillies (1927–1929) and Brooklyn Robins (1925). He enjoyed his highest win season in 1924 with the seventh-place Red Sox, when he won 14 games while losing an American League-high 17. In 1925 he divided his playing time with Boston, New York and Washington, ending with a 5–1 mark and a 3.25 ERA in seven games for the Senators AL champion team. During the World Series, he pitched well against the Pittsburgh Pirates, going 1–1 with a 3.21 ERA in two starts.

In a 10-season career, Ferguson posted a 61–85 record with 397 strikeouts and a 4.89 ERA in 257 appearances, including 166 starts, 62 complete games, two shutouts, 10 saves, and  innings of work. 
 
In 1926 Ferguson set a major league record for the highest ERA during a regular season by a pitcher who started a postseason game the same year. Ferguson collected a combined 6.18 ERA while pitching with the Red Sox, Yankees and Senators. The mark was broken in 2006 by Óliver Pérez of the New York Mets, who posted a 6.55 ERA during the regular season before starting Game 4 of the NL Championship Series.

References

External links

Baseballistic Wordpress
Retrosheet

Boston Red Sox players
Brooklyn Robins players
New York Yankees players
Philadelphia Phillies players
Washington Senators (1901–1960) players
Major League Baseball pitchers
Baseball players from New Jersey
1897 births
1976 deaths
Bridgeport Americans players
Toledo Mud Hens players
Jersey City Skeeters players
Buffalo Bisons (minor league) players
Wilkes-Barre Barons (baseball) players
York White Roses players
Durham Bulls players
Wilmington Pirates players
People from Bloomfield, New Jersey
People from Montclair, New Jersey
Sportspeople from Essex County, New Jersey